South African Airways Flight 228 was a scheduled flight from Jan Smuts International Airport in Johannesburg, South Africa, to London Heathrow International Airport in England. The plane operating the flight, which was only 6 weeks old, flew into the ground soon after take-off after a scheduled stopover in Windhoek, South West Africa (present day Namibia) on 20 April 1968. Five passengers survived, while 123 people died.  The subsequent investigation determined that the accident was attributable largely to pilot error; the manufacturer subsequently also recognised the lack of a ground proximity warning system in its aircraft.  The accident is the deadliest aviation accident to date in Namibia.

History of the flight
South African Airways Flight 228 was a scheduled flight of the Boeing 707-300C Pretoria, registration ZS-EUW, from Johannesburg to Heathrow via Windhoek, Luanda, Las Palmas and Frankfurt. Flight 228 was piloted by Captain Eric Ray Smith (49), First Officer John Peter Holliday (34), Relief First Officer Richard Fullarton Armstrong (26), The Flight Navigator Harry Charles Howe (44) and Flight Engineer Phillip Andrew Minnaar (50).

The first leg of the flight from Johannesburg to JG Strijdom Airport, Windhoek, South West Africa, was uneventful. An additional 46 passengers embarked in Windhoek, and some airfreight was unloaded and loaded. The aircraft took off from Windhoek on runway 08 at 18:49 GMT (20:49 local time). It was a dark, moonless night with few, if any, lights on the ground in the open desert east of the runway; the aircraft took off into what was described in the official report as a "black hole".

The four engines, which were the first parts of the aircraft to touch the ground, created four gouges in the soil before the rest of the aircraft also hit the ground and broke up. Two fires immediately broke out when fuel in the wings ignited. Although the crash site was only  from the end of the runway, emergency services took 40 minutes to reach the scene because of rugged terrain. Nine passengers who were seated in the forward section of the fuselage initially survived, but two died soon after the accident, and another two a few days later, leaving a final death toll of 123 passengers and crew.

Investigation

The investigation was complicated by the fact that the aircraft did not have a flight data recorder or cockpit voice recorder; the devices became mandatory from 1 January 1968, but the airline's inability to procure recorders meant that several SAA aircraft, including ZS-EUW, did not yet have the equipment fitted. Captain Smith had 4,608 flying hours on the Boeing 707, but only one hour (which was in training) on the new type 344C. The official investigation concluded that the aircraft and its four engines were in working order— primary fault lay with the captain and first officer, as they "failed to maintain a safe airspeed and altitude and a positive climb by not observing flight instruments during take-off"; no blame was attributed to the third pilot, whose responsibility it was to monitor the radio, and who was unable to monitor the flight instruments from his position in the cockpit. Secondary factors that may have contributed to the accident included:
Loss of situational awareness
The crew had no visual reference in the dark, leading to spatial disorientation.
Temporary confusion on the part of the pilots when reading the vertical speed indicator, which was different from the A and B series of the aircraft to which they were accustomed.
The drum-type altimeter fitted to the aircraft, was notoriously difficult for pilots to read; the crew may have misread their altitude by 1000 feet.
Flight deck distraction as the result of a bird strike or other minor occurrence.

After investigating this accident, as well as a number of others that also involved controlled flight into terrain, the Federal Aviation Administration determined that a ground proximity warning system would have helped prevent some of the accidents.  New regulations were therefore introduced from February 1972 requiring all turbojet aircraft to be fitted with the system.

See also
Sensory illusions in aviation

References

External links 
"Report by the Board of Inquiry into the Accident to South African Airways Boeing 707-344C Aircraft ZS-EUW at Windhoek on 20 April 1968." (Archive)
Photographs of accident site

Aviation accidents and incidents in 1968
1968 in South West Africa
Aviation accidents and incidents in Namibia
Airliner accidents and incidents caused by pilot error
Accidents and incidents involving the Boeing 707
South African Airways accidents and incidents
Airliner accidents and incidents involving controlled flight into terrain
1968 in South Africa
April 1968 events in Africa